The 2015–16 Wyoming Cowboys basketball team represented the University of Wyoming during the 2015–16 NCAA Division I men's basketball season. Their head coach was Larry Shyatt in his sixth and final year, including his first tenure in 1998. Shyatt resigned at the end of the year to take a job in the NBA. They played their home games at the Arena-Auditorium in Laramie, Wyoming. The Cowboys were a member of the Mountain West Conference. They finished the season 14–18, 7–11 in Mountain West play to finish in a tie for eighth place. They lost in the first round of the Mountain West tournament to Utah State.

On March 21, head coach Larry Shyatt resigned.

Previous season
The Cowboys finished the season 25–10, 11–7 in Mountain West play to finish in a tie for fourth place. They defeated Utah State, Boise State and San Diego State to become champions of the Mountain West tournament. They received an automatic bid to the NCAA tournament where they lost in the second round to Northern Iowa.

Departures

Incoming transfers

Incoming Recruits

2016 Recruiting Class

Roster

Statistics
Source:

Schedule and results

|-
!colspan=9 style="background:#492f24; color:#ffc425;"| Exhibition

|-
!colspan=9 style="background:#492f24; color:#ffc425;"| Non-conference regular season

|-
!colspan=9 style="background:#492f24; color:#ffc425;"| Mountain West regular season

|-
!colspan=9 style="background:#492f24; color:#ffc425;"| Mountain West tournament

References

Wyoming Cowboys basketball seasons
Wyoming
Wyoming Cowboys bask
Wyoming Cowboys bask